Labyrinth of Lies is a 2014 German drama film directed by Giulio Ricciarelli. Based on true events, it was screened in the Contemporary World Cinema section at the 2014 Toronto International Film Festival. It was selected as the German submission for the Academy Award for Best Foreign Language Film at the 88th Academy Awards, making the December shortlist of nine films, but it was not nominated.

Plot
In 1958, Johann Radmann is a young and idealistic public prosecutor who takes an interest in the case of Charles Schulz, a former Auschwitz extermination camp commander who is now teaching at a school in Frankfurt am Main. Radmann is determined to bring Schulz to justice, but finds his efforts frustrated because of the many former Nazis who are serving in government and looking out for one another.

Radmann's boss, the prosecutor-general Fritz Bauer, puts him in charge of investigating former workers at the Auschwitz camp. The U.S. occupation forces give him access to their files, and he discovers there were 8,000 workers. He goes after Josef Mengele, who lives in Argentina, but flies back to West Germany to visit his family. After the authorities block Radmann's attempt to issue an arrest warrant, his boss warns him off and orders him to concentrate on lower-profile suspects. The department invites Mossad agents to visit, and shares its information with them. As a result, Adolf Eichmann is kidnapped and spirited away to Israel where he is tried, convicted and executed for his crimes. Having pulled off this coup, Israel declines to pursue Mengele.

Meanwhile, Radmann allows himself to be seduced by Marlene, a seamstress who, benefiting from Radmann's connections, starts a business as a dress designer. Radmann reaches a crisis when he discovers his own father was in the Nazi party. When he tells Marlene that her father too was in the party, she ends their relationship. By the end of the film, however, there is a chance she will have him back. He resigns his official post and goes to work for an industrialist. There he is again confronted with the dilemma: do what is right; or do what the system requires you to do?

When he finds this means working with a colleague who had defended a former Nazi he was investigating, Radmann walks out. His idealism has suffered from hard encounters with the real world; at every turn, the "system" wants compliance, but he wants justice. He comes to understand that the only thing that can ease the horror is not justice, but attention to the lives and stories of those who suffered. Growing out of the simplistic right/wrong moralizing, he comes to understand life as more complex, and seeks to repair all the damage, large and small, he inflicted in his zeal.

After going to Auschwitz to say kaddish, the Jewish mourning prayer, for a friend's two daughters who were killed there, he goes back to work for the West German state prosecutor. The film ends with the opening of the trial of several hundred former Auschwitz perpetrators.

Cast
 Alexander Fehling as Johann Radmann
 Johannes Krisch as Simon Kirsch
 Friederike Becht as Marlene
 Hansi Jochmann as Secretary
 Johann von Bülow as Otto Haller
 Gert Voss as Fritz Bauer
 Robert Hunger-Bühler as Walter Friedberg
 André Szymanski as Thomas Gnielka
 Tim Williams as Major Parker

Reception

Critical reception
On review aggregator website Rotten Tomatoes, the film holds an approval rating of 82%, based on 79 reviews, and an average rating of 6.54/10. The website's critical consensus reads, "Labyrinth of Lies artfully blends fact with well-intentioned fiction to offer a thought-provoking look at how the lessons of history can be easily lost or forgotten." On Metacritic, the film has a weighted average score of 62 out of 100, based on 19 critics, indicating "generally favorable reviews".

Accolades
At 2014's Les Arcs European Cinema Festival, the film received a Special Mention from the Jury, and won the Prix du Public (audience award).

See also
 The People vs. Fritz Bauer (2015)
 List of submissions to the 88th Academy Awards for Best Foreign Language Film
 List of German submissions for the Academy Award for Best Foreign Language Film

References

External links
 

2014 films
2014 drama films
2010s historical drama films
2010s legal films
German historical drama films
2010s German-language films
Films set in the 1950s
Films set in the 1960s
Films set in West Germany
Films about lawyers
Films about Nazi hunters
Aftermath of the Holocaust
2010s German films